A throat guard is a piece of protective equipment worn in various sports, including baseball, ice hockey, and lacrosse. Throat guards can be made of metal, leather, and/or plastic, and may be built in to a mask or attached separately.

The guard was invented in 1976 by Los Angeles Dodgers trainer Bill Buhler after catcher Steve Yeager was impaled in the throat by pieces of a broken bat. It was designed to hang from the bottom of the catcher's mask and protect against foul balls. This guard was compared to a goat's beard.

The guard is now required in numerous youth and amateur baseball leagues, including Little League. The NCAA requires it for baseball and softball.

References

Protective gear